Hundstrup is a small town located on the island of Funen in south-central Denmark, in Svendborg Municipality. It is four kilometers north of Vester Skerninge and 14 kilometers northwest of Svendborg.

The apple variety, Filippa originated in Hundstrup.

References 

Cities and towns in the Region of Southern Denmark
Svendborg Municipality